The USA Rugby League (USARL) is the official governing body for rugby league, a code of rugby football, in the United States.

The organization also runs the national amateur competition for club teams in the US.  The league consists of six teams located in east coast states whose season ends in the USARL Grand Final. The regular season is played between May and September.

The league was founded in 2011 by clubs that had broken with the established American National Rugby League (AMNRL), plus expansion franchises. The USARL began its inaugural season in 2011 with eight teams. The USARL was granted affiliate membership in November 2014 of the RLIF and RLEF, replacing the AMNRL which is now defunct.

History

2011–2012: Foundation
The formation of the USA Rugby League was announced on 12 January 2011. Seven teams that had previously competed in the  American National Rugby League, the United States' established rugby league organization and recognized governing body for the sport, announced they were breaking with the AMNRL to form a new league. The stated reason for the split was dissatisfaction with the governance of the AMNRL; the departing teams were unhappy with the lack of club involvement in the league's decision making, and the new league was founded with the principle of including its member clubs in its administration.

The departing AMNRL teams were the Boston Thirteens, the Washington, D.C. Slayers, the Fairfax Eagles, the Jacksonville Axemen, the New Haven Warriors, the Philadelphia Fight, and the Pittsburgh Vipers; they were to be joined by two new teams, the New Jersey Turnpike Titans and Kodiak Rugby from New York City. Before the season Pittsburgh and Fairfax became "developmental" teams in the new league outside of the top-tiered competition; Fairfax subsequently suspended operations. The New York team was unable to find a suitable stadium in the city, and instead became the Rhode Island Rebellion. One additional team, Oneida FC, joined the top-tiered competition for the 2011 season.

On 13 January 2011, the USARL announced that Peter Illfield, chairman of the Philadelphia Fight, would be the league's first chairman. The league's first event was a rugby league nines tournament in the Philadelphia area on 28–29 May 2011. Round 1 of the regular season championship kicked off on 4 June; the Jacksonville Axemen won the minor premiership with the best regular season record. In the inaugural Grand Final on 27 August, the Philadelphia Fight defeated the New Haven Warriors to win their first ever national championship.

2013–2014: Expansion
In 2013 the USARL and AMNRL increased their focus on reunification, particularly after the United States' encouraging showing at the 2013 Rugby League World Cup. An independent commission assembled to lead negotiations, however the USARL clubs eventually pulled out. USARL commissioner Peter Illfield blamed apparent dysfunction and disorganization in the AMNRL organization for this decision. The USARL subsequently invited AMNRL clubs to join their ranks as full members and initiated a four-team expansion.

In 2014, the USARL expanded to 10 teams, adding expansion squads Atlanta Rhinos, Central Florida Warriors, and Tampa Mayhem.  In addition, the Northern Virginia Eagles withdrew from the AMNRL and joined the USARL.  To reduce operating costs, the competition was split into two conferences. Meanwhile, the AMNRL suspended its 2014 season.

2015–2020: AMNRL folds
In 2015, the AMNRL folded, leaving the USARL as the undisputed top-level rugby league competition in the United States. Three former AMNRL clubs joined the USARL; Bucks County Sharks, Connecticut Wildcats, and New York Knights. The Delaware Black Foxes also joined as an expansion squad.  For 2016, the Connecticut Wildcats left the competition and were replaced by the White Plains Wombats.  Before the 2017 season, the D.C. Slayers and Bucks County Sharks left the competition, and the USARL abolished the division structure within the North Conference.  Before the 2018 season, the Central Florida Warriors left the competition and were replaced by Southwest Florida Copperheads and Danny Hanson was appointed the second league chairman.  The Rhode Island Rebellion also left the competition. The New York Knights left the competition after the 2018 season.

2021–present: NARL era
USARL membership has been in flux since the announcement of the North American Rugby League in spring 2021. Boston 13s and Philadelphia Fight left USARL to be founding members of the new competition. White Plains folded after NARL established the New York Freedom. Northern Virginia folded after most of its players joined the newly established DC Cavalry in NARL. Lakeland Renegades suspended operations due to the COVID-19 pandemic.

The 2021 USARL season was contested by six teams. Philadelphia and Delaware in the North; Tampa, Jacksonville, Southwest Florida Copperheads, and South Florida Speed in the South. USARL South Championships Tampa Mayhem defeated North winners Delaware Black Foxes in the championship. The North Division has been unable to play in 2022. Multiple forfeits by South Florida Speed in July 2022 have put their future with USARL in doubt.

Structure
The first event of the season is the rugby league nines tournament.

Regular season
The USARL is split into two conferences, North and South.  In the South Conference, teams play a double round-robin schedule of 8 games.  In the North Conference, teams play a single round-robin schedule of 5 games plus an additional 3 games.  Teams qualify for the playoffs based on point differential, with a win counting for 2 points, a draw for 1, a loss for 0, and a forfeit for −2.  The regular season runs through May and July.

Play-offs
In the South Conference, the top four teams make the playoffs.  The teams with the best and worst records, and the second- and third-best records, play each other in the South Conference semi-finals. The winners meet in the South Conference finals. In the North Conference, the teams with the six best records make the playoffs.  The winners of the South Conference finals meet the winners of the North Conference finals in the USARL Grand Final.

Teams

Former teams

*= On hiatus due to return in 2021.

Premiership winners

For the first three seasons, the USARL was a single-division competition. In 2014 the teams were split into two conferences and three divisions.

Winners

Development programs

As part of the 2011 season, a former AMNRL team, the Pittsburgh Sledgehammers, participated as a "developmental team", playing a more limited schedule while developing the club for future seasons.

Representative sides
New England Immortals

The New England Immortals RLFC were founded in 2010 and consisted of the top players from the 3 New England based AMNRL clubs. They played their inaugural match against the Canadian National Team, on 31 July 2010, defeating the Canadians 12–8 in a tightly contested match. After the AMNRL/USARL split in 2011, the Immortals were transferred to the USARL and became the only form of representation for USARL clubs due to the RLIF regulation that USARL-based players could not represent the Tomahawks.  The Immortals took to the field for their second match since their inception, and despite putting up a hard fight, they were out classed by the more experienced Marines, losing by a score of 68–12. As of 2014, due to budgetary cuts and restructuring of the USARL competition, the Immortals have not played a match since their loss to the Royal Marines.

USA Pioneers

In 2014, the league established a touring developmental side, the USA Pioneers, to play friendly matches against foreign nations. They completed a two match tour in Jamaica in April 2014, winning their first game against a Jamaican domestic outfit, but fell short to the semi-professional Hurricanes Rugby League whilst still proving to be strong opposition for the Jamaicans. The Pioneers played a friendly against a touring New Zealand Police squad the following August, losing 6–62 against very strong opposition.

Presidents Barbarians

The USARL established another team to play a second match against the New Zealand Police and to 'curtain-raise' the 2014 USARL National Championship between the Philadelphia Fight and the Jacksonville Axemen. This representative consisted of overseas-imports from Australia, New Zealand, United Kingdom and France; similar to Super League's Exiles. They were beaten by the Kiwis 16–46.

See also

 Rugby league in the United States
 Rugby League World Cup
 North American Rugby League
 American National Rugby League
 List of American rugby league champions
 List of defunct rugby league clubs in the United States

References

External links

 
Sports governing bodies in the United States
Rugby league governing bodies
Rugby league in the United States
Sports organizations established in 2011
2011 establishments in the United States